Governor Blanchard may refer to:

James Blanchard (born 1942), 45th Governor of Michigan
Newton C. Blanchard (1849–1922), 33rd governor of Louisiana